This is a list of submissions to the 47th Academy Awards for Best Foreign Language Film. The Academy Award for Best Foreign Language Film was created in 1956 by the Academy of Motion Picture Arts and Sciences to honour non-English-speaking films produced outside the United States. The award is handed out annually, and is accepted by the winning film's director, although it is considered an award for the submitting country as a whole. Countries are invited by the Academy to submit their best films for competition according to strict rules, with only one film being accepted from each country.

For the 47th Academy Awards, nineteen films were submitted in the category Academy Award for Best Foreign Language Film. The highlighted titles were the five nominated films, which came from Argentina, France, Hungary, Italy and Poland. Italy won the Oscar for Federico Fellini's slice-of-life comedy-drama, Amarcord.

Submissions

Notes

  Japan submitted The Fossil, but the film was not listed on the official list from AMPAS. It appears likely that the film was not screened.
  The Soviet Union selected The Ferocious One, a film from the Kyrgyz Republic with mostly Russian dialogue.

References

Sources
 Margaret Herrick Library, Academy of Motion Picture Arts and Sciences

47